Traffik is a 2018 American horror-thriller film directed and written by Deon Taylor and starring Paula Patton, Omar Epps, Laz Alonso, Roselyn Sanchez, Luke Goss, William Fichtner, and Missi Pyle. It follows a group of friends who are terrorized by a gang of bikers in a remote countryside home. It was released on April 20, 2018, by Summit Entertainment, received generally unfavorable reviews from critics and grossed $9 million worldwide.

Plot
Brea (Paula Patton) is a journalist for the Sacramento Post, who is upset to find that a rival journalist is covering a major scandal story that she had been trying to get published for months. Brea confronts her boss, Carl (William Fichtner), who says her story is just a fluff piece and threatens to fire her.

Brea goes out for a birthday dinner with her boyfriend John (Omar Epps) and their friends Darren (Laz Alonso) and Malia (Roselyn Sanchez). Darren ruins a surprise that John has planned for Brea: to take her on a romantic getaway in the California mountains. The ladies then go to the bathroom and Brea tells Malia she thinks John might propose while they are away, but says she is not ready for that yet.

John surprises Brea with a car he built in his shop as they head off on their vacation. They stop at a gas station where Brea meets a scared-looking woman named Cara (Dawn Olivieri). She says to Brea "Sure feels a lot like the Fourth of July, doesn't it?" before an angry biker guy interrupts and orders Cara to hurry up so they can leave. Outside, another biker from the group is bugging John. John tells him he does not want trouble, leading the biker to spit on his car. John responds by punching him in the face and the biker then pulls out a knife. As Brea rushes over, Sheriff Marnes (Missi Pyle) intervenes and tells the bikers to stay away.

Moments later on the road, one of the bikers starts to follow John and Brea, demanding they pull over. John speeds up then stops suddenly to cause the biker to swerve off the road and roll down a hill. Back at the gas station, the bikers' leader, Red (Luke Goss), chastises his group for drawing attention to themselves and failing to get their hands on Brea.

The couple arrive at their vacation house and spend the afternoon together in the pool. Their evening is disrupted when Darren and Malia make an unannounced visit, despite Darren making Malia believe that John was cool with it. The couples hang out until Darren gets a phone call letting him know that an athlete he represents just got jailed. They then hear a ringing sound coming from Brea's bag. She finds a satellite phone and realizes that Cara slipped it into her bag. Thinking about her Fourth of July comment, Brea figures out that it is a pass-code and they unlock the phone. They find hundreds of pictures of battered women posing for ads, making the couples realize that she is part of a trafficking ring.

Brea decides to call the police, but Darren stops her, suggesting she only wants to get involved to be able to write about it to get her job back. They argue, and Darren reveals that John and Malia hooked up long before they knew either Brea or Darren. An upset Malia breaks up with Darren and leaves. Moments later, there is a knock at the door, and it is Cara. She asks for her phone back but Brea offers to help her. Cara becomes angry and runs away. John, Brea and Darren attempt to follow her, only to see Red and the biker gang turn on their headlights. When Cara tells Red she did not get the phone back, he shoots her in the head. The three run back into the house and Darren demands that they give up the phone. He goes outside and sees Malia's bag, realising the bikers have her. He tries to make a deal with Red to exchange the phone for Malia but Red declines. Darren tries to pull his own gun on them, but the bikers stab him repeatedly before Red shoots him dead.

John and Brea escape the house through the garage and run into the woods as they are pursued by the bikers. One of them catches up to them and attacks John with a knife, but Brea hits him with a large branch before John gets hold of the knife and stabs him. The couple then run to a cabin where an old man lives. He lets them inside to use the phone to call 911. A biker arrives and shoots the old man before attacking the couple. The biker fights John and shoots him in the side before Brea stabs him in the back. John manages to take the gun from the biker and shoots him in the head, but his own wound is fatal. He tells Brea to get the old man's car keys and reaffirms his love for her before dying. Brea finds the engagement ring that John was planning to propose with, and she wears it for him.

Brea goes outside to try to start the car, but Red and the last biker find her. Before they can take her, Marnes arrives with a deputy following John's phone call. However, Marnes turns out to be part of the trafficking scheme, and she shoots and kills the deputy. She then berates Red and the biker for manhandling the girls since they are products, as well as not deleting the evidence on the phone. They sedate Brea and take her away.

Brea wakes up in a hidden location with other trafficked women, including Malia. Red enters and tells Brea he is keeping her all to himself. He begins to sexually assault her and she responds by sticking a nail in his neck before bludgeoning him to death. The biker attacks Brea but Malia overdoses him with his sedative. Brea promises she will come back for Malia before going to get help. After leaving the woods, she finds herself near the gas station from before. Inside, she asks the clerk to call the police, and Marnes answers the phone. Brea also swipes a cell phone and calls Carl for help.

After dark, Marnes arrives for Brea. She orders her outside to arrest her. Brea asks Marnes if she takes any pride in trafficking women for profit. Marnes responds that everything is trafficked and she is just part of the system. Brea tells Marnes it is slavery and calls her a traitor to all women. Marnes cuffs Brea and takes her outside, only for a whole squad of cops to show up. Marnes is arrested, and the cops rescue all of the trafficked women.

Months later back in Sacramento, Brea returns to work where Carl tells her that the trafficking ring bust will be big news everywhere and that the people involved will most likely go after Brea. She simply replies "Let them come" before walking out.

The film ends with real life statistics about sex trafficking, revealing 1.9 million women are currently being trafficked in the United States.

Cast 
 Paula Patton as Brea
 Omar Epps as John
 Laz Alonso as Darren Cole 
 Roselyn Sanchez as Malia
 Luke Goss as Red, the leader of the bikers and the human trafficking ring 
 William Fichtner as Carl Waynewright
 Dawn Olivieri as Cara
 Missi Pyle as Sheriff Sally Marnes
 Lorin McCraley as Billy
 Adrian Bustamante as a dispatcher

Release 
Lionsgate acquired the rights to the film for $5 million in September 2017. Traffik was theatrically released on April 20, 2018, by Lionsgate's Summit Entertainment. It was originally slated for April 27, 2018, but was moved up a week to avoid competition from Avengers: Infinity War.

Reception

Box office
In the United States and Canada, Traffik was released alongside I Feel Pretty and Super Troopers 2, and was projected to gross $3–4 million from 1,046 theaters in its opening weekend. The film made $225,000 from Thursday night previews and $1.4 million on its first day, including previews. It went on to debut to $3.9 million, finishing 9th at the box office. In its second weekend the film dropped 58% to $1.7 million, finishing 10th.

Critical response
The website's critical consensus reads, "Traffik highlights Paula Patton's impressive dramatic chops — and smothers them in a thoroughly underwhelming exploitation thriller." On Metacritic, the film has a weighted average score of 37 out of 100, based on 10 critics, indicating "generally unfavorable reviews."

References

Further reading

External links 

 
 
 
 
 
 

2018 thriller films
American thriller films
Films about human trafficking
Films directed by Deon Taylor
Films scored by Geoff Zanelli
Films shot in California
Home invasions in film
Outlaw biker films
Summit Entertainment films
2010s English-language films
2010s American films